Shunling Subdistrict is a subdistrict and the county seat of Ningyuan County in Hunan, China. The subdistrict is located in the centre of county, dividing a portion of the former Shunling Town, it was formed in 2013.

References

Ningyuan County
County seats in Hunan